Talco is an Italian ska punk band and alternative band from Marghera, Venice. Musically the group combines the horns and rhythms of ska-punk with Italian folk music. Their lyrics reflect the band's support for left-wing politics and often include anti-fascist, anti-capitalist, and anti-imperialist themes. Musical influences include The Clash, Ska-P, Modena City Ramblers and especially Mano Negra, often describing their sound as "patchanka" after Mano Negra's first album.

In 2009 the group wrote the song "St. Pauli" about the cult German football club FC St. Pauli. The team has since used the song as an anthem and Talco has played a number of concerts at Millerntor-Stadion in Hamburg, Germany.

Discography

Studio albums
 Tutti Assolti (2004)
 L'Odore della Morte
 11 Settembre '73
 60 Anni
 Notti Cilene
 Rachel
 Corri
 Partigiano
 Tutti Assolti
 La Crociata del Dittatore Bianco
 Signor Presidente
 Combat Circus (2006)
 Tortuga
 La Sedia Vuota
 Il Passo del Caciurdo
 Combat Circus
 Venghino, Signori Venghino
 La Carovana
 Testamento Di Un Buffone
 Oro Nero
 Bella Ciao
 La Fabbrica Del Dissenso
 A la Patchanka
 Diari Perduti
Mazel Tov (2008)
 Intro
 L'era del Contrario
 Radio Aut
 Il Mio Tempo
 Nel Villaggio
 Il Treno
 Merlutz
 La casa Dell'Impunità
 Tarantella dell'ultimo Bandito
 La mano de Dios
 Il Lamento Del Mare
 Mazel Tov
 St. Pauli
La Cretina Commedia (2010)
 Intro 
 Correndo Solo
 Dalla Grotta
 Punta Raisi
 Al Carneval
 La parabola dei Battagghi
 Ultima età
 Non è tempo di campare
 Onda Pazza
 La Cretina Commedia
 Perduto Maggio
 La mia terra
 Casa Memoria
 Gran Galà (2012)
 Gran Galà
 La Mia Città
 San Maritan
 Danza dell'autunno Rosa
 La Roda de la Fortuna
 La Macchina del Fango
 All'adunata del Feticchio
 I Giorni E Una Notte
 Dai Nomadi
 La Veglia Del Re Nudo
 A Picco
 Teleternità
 XIII
 Ancora
 Un'idea
 Silent Town (2015)
 Il Tempo
 Neverdad
 El Sombra
 Nel Varieta
 Rotolando
 Silent Town
 Via da qui
 Intermondo
 Dalla pallida mirò
 Nella strada
 Ovunque
 Malandia
 And The Winner Isn’t (2018)
 Al Parto Sfigurato Della Superiorità
 Onda Immobile
 Señor Hood
 Bomaye
 Reclame
 Lunga La Macabra Stanza
 And The Winner Isn’t
 La Verità
 Intervallo
 Domingo Road
 Avatar
 Matematica Idea
 Silent Avenue (Nella Strada II)
 Locktown (2021)
 Locktown
 Il tempo
 Paradise crew
 San maritan
 Danza dell'autunno rosa
 La mia parte peggiore
 Freak 
 La verità
 Clock
 Testamento di un buffone
 Descarrila
 Fine di una storia
 Tarantella dell'ultimo bandito
 La torre
 Addio
 Insert Coin (2022)
 Radio Countdown
 La Libertà
 Lo Spettacolo
 Papel
 Ames
 Videogame (2022)
 Videogame
 Via
 Paradise crew
 Muro di Plastica
 Descarrila
 Frenetica (Strum)
 Psicolabirinto
 Game Over
 Continue (Strum)
 Garage Jukebox
 La Venuta Di Banalità
 Giga Popular
 Ultimo Viaggio
 Others
 Talco Mentolato (Maqueta)
 Live (Maqueta)

Live albums
 '10 Years (Live in Iruña) (2014)
 Intro
 L’Odore della morte
 Punta raisi
 Tarantella dell’uomo bandito
 La parabola dei battagghi
 Fischia il vento
 La carovana
 San maritan
 Correndo solo
 St. Pauli
 Testamento di un buffone
 La mia città
 Teleternita
 La sedia vuota
 L’era del contrario
 Bella ciao
 A la patchanka
 Ancora
 Danza dell’autunno rosa
 La roda de la fortuna
 Tortuga
 La torre

Compilations and Collaborations
 100 Jahre St. Pauli - St. Pauli St. Pauli EP - St. Pauli Skannibal Party Vol.4 - "Notti Cilene Nextpunk Vol.2 - L'odore della morte Punx United for Chapas - 60 anni Kob vs Mad Butcher - Corri e La Carovana''

References

Italian rock music groups
Italian ska groups